Karla Jurvetson (born 1966) is an American physician, philanthropist, and major Democratic donor. She has particularly focused on supporting candidates who are women, people of color, and from underrepresented communities.

Career 
Jurvetson works as a private practice physician in Los Altos, California.

Personal life 
Karla Jurvetson was born in New Haven, Connecticut and grew up in Palo Alto, CA.  Her mother was a nurse, her father Jared Tinklenberg was a physician and medical school professor, and her grandfather was a Christian chaplain in the U.S. Navy. She earned a bachelor's degree in human biology with honors and distinction from Stanford University, a medical doctorate from the University of California School of Medicine, and completed her residency at Stanford Hospital.

In 1990, she married Steve Jurvetson, who became a Silicon Valley early-stage investor in companies including SpaceX in 2000 and Tesla in 2006. They were married for more than 25 years and have two children.  They separated in 2015 and were divorced in 2018. In 2017, to honor her father's 50-year career as a medical school professor, Jurvetson helped fund the construction of the new Stanford Medical Center and endowed a professorship in her parents’ names.

Philanthropy 
Jurvetson served on the board of directors of Peninsula Open Space Trust from 2003 to 2006 and was a founding donor to Wildlife Conservation Network (2002 to present). After touring deforestation on the slopes of Mauna Kea in 2016, she sponsored the planting of 1,000 indigenous trees through the Hawaiian Legacy Reforestation Initiative.

Jurvetson has been a trustee on several other non-profit boards, including the San Francisco Ballet (2000-2003). She was named by Gentry Magazine as one of the top philanthropists in the San Francisco Bay Area.

She served as a school board member (2011-2018) for The Nueva School, which is located in the San Francisco Bay Area and was previously a pre-kindergarten through 8th grade school.  She co-chaired the school's $50 million capital campaign, which resulted in the construction of a new campus in San Mateo and a school expansion to include grades 9-12. Nueva Upper School opened one grade at a time starting in 2013, and is currently ranked in the top 10 high schools in America.

Political activism 

Karla Jurvetson has volunteered as a political organizer and a fundraiser for many Democratic candidates over the past thirty years.

As a Stanford undergraduate in 1988, Jurvetson went door-to-door for Anna Eshoo during her first campaign for Congress, handing out VCR tapes of Eshoo discussing her candidacy. In 2008 Jurvetson volunteered in the swing state of Nevada for then-candidate Barack Obama, as well as making 46 contributions to Democrats totaling $128,700.

In 2016, she canvassed in Nevada for Hillary Clinton and for Catherine Cortez Masto, who became the first Latina U.S. Senator. After the election of Donald Trump in November 2016, her donations to Democratic candidates markedly increased to $6.9 million in advance of the 2018 midterms, making her one of the nation's top political donors.

In an interview about the 2018 elections, Jurvetson said, "Women disproportionately were the activists, the volunteers, the people who drove change... Women have gained enough economic power and political power so we can translate our frustration into action... I feel like it’s our moral duty, if we’re not going to run ourselves, to support the women who are brave enough to put their names on the ballot."

For the 2018 elections, Jurvetson helped with voter registration drives, and co-hosted fundraisers for Democratic Party candidates. 

Jurvetson serves on the Board of Directors of EMILY's List, the nation's largest organization for women in politics, which has over five million members.

Controversy arose with her large donation of $5.4m to Women Vote!, the political action committee run by EMILY's List. Her donation was in the form of Baidu shares, a Chinese internet company traded on the US stock exchange and was unusual outside of Silicon Valley since it was in the form of stock shares. The controversy arose because only American citizens can donate to U.S. elections. An EMILY's List spokesperson said, "We cleared the donation through our lawyers".  In November 2018, Jurvetson was listed as one of five "surprising million dollar donors" to the US midterm elections.  EMILY's List would fund the successful campaign of Congresswoman Sharice Davids (KS-03) in 2018, the second Native American woman ever elected to Congress.  The Democrats would go on to retake control of the U.S. House of Representatives in 2018.

In November 2019, Jurvetson hosted a Democratic National Committee (DNC) reception at her home in November 2019 with President Barack Obama. At that time, the DNC had just $8.7 million cash on hand and $7 million in debts, compared to the Republican National Committee and the Trump campaign, which had over $158 million cash on hand.  Golden State Warriors player Stephen Curry and his wife, Ayesha Curry, were co-hosts for the event, which raised over $3.5 million for the DNC Unity Fund that was formed to support the eventual Democratic presidential nominee.

In 2019, Jurvetson contributed over $1 million to Fair Fight, an organization founded by Stacey Abrams after her narrow loss in the 2018 race for governor of Georgia against Brian Kemp.  In January 2020 she was a large contributor to Persist PAC, which supported Elizabeth Warren's presidential campaign. In June 2020, when Joe Biden secured the Democratic nomination, she contributed $1,000,000 to his PAC, Unite the Country. Outside of the presidential race, Jurvetson donated to more than 500 races across the country in 2020, ranging from congressional contests to state-level races. She also gave $3.9 million to Forward Majority Action, a PAC focused on winning state-level contests.

In 2021 and early 2022, Jurvetson was a leader among major Democratic donors in urging President Biden, Senate Majority Leader Schumer and Democratic Congressional leaders to pursue passage of comprehensive voting rights legislation in response to laws passed in many states by Republican legislatures to severely limit or restrict ballot access and voting rights.

For the 2022 election cycle, Jurvetson had "a particular focus on electing Democratic governors in 2024 battleground states who could be a bulwark against election shenanigans if Trump runs again", including support for Katie Hobbs in Arizona, Gretchen Whitmer in Michigan, Josh Shapiro in Pennsylvania, and other battleground states. She supported Texas State Representative Jasmine Crockett's campaign for Congress in the 30th Congressional District (Dallas-Ft. Worth). Jurvetson was an early supporter of Crockett. Crockett said she met Jurvetson at a private dinner in D.C. along with the brother of civil rights icon John Lewis, following a march for voting rights. Jurvetson was impressed with Crockett's stance on the issue of voting rights.

In 2023, Jurvetson has continued her focus on high-profile elections in swing and battleground states like Arizona and Wisconsin. In Wisconsin, Jurvetson has been among the largest donors to Judge Janet Protasiewicz in her race to win a seat on the Wisconsin Supreme Court. Jurvetson is also an early backer of Arizona Congressman Ruben Gallego's campaign to defeat Senator Kyrsten Sinema in the 2024 Democratic primary, and co-hosted a major fundraiser for his Senate campaign in February 2023.  Jurvetson had strongly supported Sinema in her first run for Senate in 2018, but became strongly disappointed in SInema's refusal to support filibuster reform and voting rights legislation.

References

External links 
 

Year of birth missing (living people)
Living people
21st-century American physicians
People from Palo Alto, California
Stanford University alumni
University of California alumni
American women psychiatrists
American psychiatrists
American political activists
21st-century American women physicians
20th-century American women physicians
American women philanthropists
Philanthropists from California
20th-century American physicians
Physicians from California